General Rose may refer to:

Hugh Rose, 1st Baron Strathnairn (1801–1885), British Army general
Maurice Rose (1899–1945), U.S. Army major general
Michael Rose (British Army officer) (born 1940), British Army general
Patricia Rose (fl. 1980s–2010s), U.S. Air Force major general
William I. Rose (United States Army officer) (1898–1954), Massachusetts National Guard major general